The Merry Karnowsky Gallery was founded in Los Angeles in 1997 by Merry Karnowsky. It is located on South La Brea Avenue in the Mid-City West district of Central Los Angeles.

The gallery exhibits contemporary art, and it is part of the underground "lowbrow" art movement, showing works of pop surrealism and from the street art scene. Exhibitions have included the artists: Shepard Fairey, Camille Rose Garcia, Mercedes Helnwein, Dave McKean, Mark Ryden, Todd Schorr, Edward Walton Wilcox and Kent Williams.

In 2007, Karnowsky opened a second gallery in the Mitte district of Berlin, Germany.

See also
 Junko Mizuno
 Long Gone John
 Miss Van
 Andre the Giant Has a Posse

References

External links 
 

Art museums and galleries in Los Angeles
1997 establishments in California
Art galleries established in 1997
American companies established in 1997